Anarthrophyllum is a genus of flowering plants in the family Fabaceae. It belongs to the subfamily Faboideae.

Species
Anarthrophyllum comprises the following species:

 Anarthrophyllum andicolum (Hook. & Arn.) F. Phil.

 Anarthrophyllum burkartii Soraru
 Anarthrophyllum capitatum Soraru
 Anarthrophyllum catamarcense Soraru
 Anarthrophyllum cumingii (Hook. & Arn.) F. Phil.
 Anarthrophyllum desideratum (DC.) Benth.
 Anarthrophyllum elegans (Hook. & Arn.) F. Phil.
 Anarthrophyllum gayanum (A. Gray) B.D. Jacks.

 Anarthrophyllum macrophyllum Soraru

 Anarthrophyllum ornithopodum Sandwith
 Anarthrophyllum patagonicum Speg.
 Anarthrophyllum pedicellatum Soraru

 Anarthrophyllum rigidum (Hook. & Arn.) Hieron.
 Anarthrophyllum strigulipetalum Soraru
 Anarthrophyllum subandinum Speg.

Species names with uncertain taxonomic status
The status of the following species is unresolved:
 Anarthrophyllum burkartii Sorarú
 Anarthrophyllum capitatum Sorarú
 Anarthrophyllum catamarcense Sorarú
 Anarthrophyllum cumingii (Hook. & Arn.) Phil.
 Anarthrophyllum desideratum (DC.) Reiche
 Anarthrophyllum elegans (Gillies ex Hook. & Arn.) Phil.
 Anarthrophyllum macrophyllum Sorarú
 Anarthrophyllum pedicellatum Sorarú
 Anarthrophyllum strigulipetalum Sorarú

References

Genisteae
Fabaceae genera